Stephan Katt (born 15 September 1979) is a former motorcycle Grasstrack, Longtrack and speedway rider from Germany.

Career
Katt was a member of Germany national long track team and is a six times World Team Champion.

He rode in Britain for Somerset Rebels in 2003 and from 2006 to 2008.

Results

World Longtrack Championship
Grand-Prix
 2000 - 1 apps (24th) 3pts
 2001 - 4 apps (16th) 21pts
 2002 - 5 apps (10th) 39pts
 2003 - 4 apps (15th) 24pts
 2004 - 4 apps (9th) 43pts
 2005 - 3 apps (9th) 34pts
 2006 - 1 app (22nd) 0pts
 2007 - 3 apps (4th) 42pts
 2008 - 4 apps (7th) 38pts
 2009 - 3 apps (15th) 30pts
 2010 - 6 apps (5th) 99pts
 2011 - 6 apps (3rd) 101pts
 2012 - 6 apps (8th) 77pts
 2013 - 6 apps (13th) 56pts
 2014 - 4 apps (6th) 52pts
 2015 - 4 apps (13th) 27pts
 2016 - 3 apps (15th) 16pts

Best Grand-Prix Results
  St. Macaire First 2007
  Marianske Lazne First 2010, Third 2011
  Marmande Second 2014
  Morizes Third 2011, 2012
  Pfarrkirchen First 2010
  Vechta First 2011

Team Championship
 2007  Morizes (First) 21/51pts (Rode with Gerd Riss, Enrico Janoschka, Matthias Kroger)
 2008  Werlte (First) 7/45pts (Rode with Gerd Riss, Bernd Diener, Matthias Kroger)
 2009  Eenrum Did not compete
 2010  Morizes (First) 14/49pts (Rode with Mathias Kroger, Richard Speiser, Martin Smolinski)
 2011  Scheeßel (First) 19/56pts (Rode with Richard Speiser, Jorg Tebbe, Martin Smolinski)
 2012  St. Macaire (First) 22/48 (Rode with Matthias Kroger, Jorg Tebbe, Bernd Diener)
 2013  Folkestone (4th) 16/44pts (Rode with Richard Speiser, Jorg Tebbe, Enrico Janoschka)
 2014  Forssa (First) 6/45pts (Rode with Enrico Janoschka, Jorg Tebbe, Erik Riss)
 2015  Mühldorf (Second) 0/41pts (Rode with Jorg Tebbe, Michael Hartel, Erik Riss)
 2016  Marianske Lazne (Second) 2/44pts (Rode with Martin Smolinkski, Jorg Tebbe, Michael Hartel)

European Grasstrack Championship
 1999 Semi-finalist
 2000 Did not compete
 2001 Did not compete
 2002  Berghaupten (10th) 10pts
 2003 Semi-finalist
 2004  Eenrum (5th) 18pts
 2005  Schwarme (6th) 11pts
 2006  La Reole (CHAMPION) 18pts
 2007  Folkestone (Second) 13pts
 2008  Siddeburen (14th) 6pts
 2009  Berghaupten (CHAMPION) 17pts
 2010  La Reole (18th) 1pt
 2011  Skegness (11th) 8pts
 2012  Eenrum (CHAMPION) 16pts
 2013  Bielefeld (6th) 17pts
 2014  St. Macaire (10th) 11pts
 2015  Staphorst (Third) 16pts
 2016 Semi-finalist

References

1979 births
Living people
Sportspeople from Kiel
German racing drivers
German speedway riders
Individual Speedway Long Track World Championship riders